Punta Hermosa is one of 43 districts of the Lima Province in Peru. The capital of the district is the village of Punta Hermosa. The district's main attractions are its beaches.

Geography
Punta Hermosa borders the Pacific Ocean on the west, the Lurin, and Pachacamac on the north, Huarochirí Province's district of Santo Domingo de los Olleros on the east and the Punta Negra district on the south.

Political division
The district is divided into 4 populated centers:

 Punta Hermosa
 Capilla Lucumo
 Cucuya
 Pampapacta

Beach resort
Punta Hermosa is located 42 km south of downtown Lima, to which it is connected by the Pan-American Highway. The district's main attraction is its beaches, which are visited by thousands of people every summer.  The area, which used to be a resort/vacation district where visitors stayed only temporarily, has recently seen an urban expansion and an increase in permanent year-round residents.

See also 
 Administrative divisions of Peru
Cono Sur
Ancón District
Santa Rosa District

References

External links
 
  Municipalidad Distrital de Punta Hermosa - Official web site
  Perú Azul - Information and picture galleries on beaches in Peru

Districts of Lima